The American Football League (Polish: Liga Futbolu Amerykańskiego, PFA) was an American football league in Poland. Founded in 2017 after a split in the Polish American Football Association. It consisted of 22 teams competing in two conferences, the LFA1 and LFA2. The championship game of the league was the Polish Bowl. In 2021 a new league started with participating both old PLFA and LFA members as Polish Football League.

History
After the 2017 PLFA season, there was a split in the Polish American Football Association. 20 teams among them 5 from the TopLiga left the Polish American Football League and founded a new league.

Teams 2020

LFA 1

Polish Bowl

External links
 

American football in Poland
Defunct American football leagues in Europe